El Monte (Spanish for "the Mountain", also in archaic Spanish for "the wood") may refer to:

 El Monte, California, United States, a city
 El Monte, Chile, a city